James Daniel Slaton (April 2, 1910 or 1912 – February 25, 1961) was a United States Army soldier and a recipient of the United States military's highest decoration—the Medal of Honor—for his actions in World War II.

Biography
Slaton joined the Army from Gulfport, Mississippi in June 1942, and by September 23, 1943, was serving as a Corporal in the 157th Infantry Regiment, 45th Infantry Division. On that day, near Oliveto, Italy, he single-handedly destroyed three enemy machine gun nests. He was awarded the Medal of Honor eight months later, on May 30, 1944.

Slaton left the Army while still a Corporal. He died in 1961 and was buried at Woodlawn Cemetery in his birth city of Laurel, Mississippi.

Medal of Honor citation
Corporal Slaton's official Medal of Honor citation reads:
For conspicuous gallantry and intrepidity at the risk of life above and beyond the call of duty in action with the enemy in the vicinity of Oliveto, Italy, on September 23, 1943. Cpl. Slaton was lead scout of an infantry squad which had been committed to a flank to knock out enemy resistance which had succeeded in pinning 2 attacking platoons to the ground. Working ahead of his squad, Cpl. Slaton crept upon an enemy machinegun nest and, assaulting it with his bayonet, succeeded in killing the gunner. When his bayonet stuck, he detached it from the rifle and killed another gunner with rifle fire. At that time he was fired upon by a machinegun to his immediate left. Cpl. Slaton then moved over open ground under constant fire to within throwing distance, and on his second try scored a direct hit on the second enemy machinegun nest, killing 2 enemy gunners. At that time a third machinegun fired on him 100 yards to his front, and Cpl. Slaton killed both of these enemy gunners with rifle fire. As a result of Cpl. Slaton's heroic action in immobilizing 3 enemy machinegun nests with bayonet, grenade, and rifle fire, the 2 rifle platoons which were receiving heavy casualties from enemy fire were enabled to withdraw to covered positions and again take the initiative. Cpl. Slaton withdrew under mortar fire on order of his platoon leader at dusk that evening. The heroic actions of Cpl. Slaton were far above and beyond the call of duty and are worthy of emulation.

See also

Notes

References

1961 deaths
United States Army personnel of World War II
United States Army Medal of Honor recipients
People from Laurel, Mississippi
United States Army non-commissioned officers
1910s births
World War II recipients of the Medal of Honor